Skunkworks Live Video is the name of a live video by British singer Bruce Dickinson. It was released in 1997 in Japan only. The live performance was filmed in Pamplona and Gerona, Spain on 31 May and 1 June 1996. The backing band, which went under the name "Skunkworks", was Alex Dickson on guitars, Chris Dale as bassist, and Alessandro Elena as the drummer. The recording was originally created for the four-track EP version to be released only in Japan. The show was directed by Julian Doyle and produced by Jeremy Azis.

Track listing
All songs written and composed by Bruce Dickinson and Alex Dickson, except where noted.

 Space Race
 Back from the Edge
 Tattooed Millionaire (Bruce Dickinson, Janick Gers)
 Inertia
 Faith
 Meltdown
 I Will Not Accept the Truth
 Laughing in the Hiding Bush (Bruce Dickinson, Roy Z, Austin Dickinson)
 Tears of the Dragon (Bruce Dickinson)
 God's Not Coming Back
 Dreamstate
 The Prisoner (Iron Maiden cover) (Adrian Smith, Steve Harris)

Personnel
Bruce Dickinson – vocals
Alex Dickson – guitars
Chris Dale – bass
Alessandro Elena – drums

References

External links
Bruce Dickinson's official website

Bruce Dickinson albums
Bruce Dickinson video albums
Albums with cover art by Storm Thorgerson